Turbo cepoides is a species of sea snail, marine gastropod mollusk in the family Turbinidae.

This is a species inquirenda.

Some authors place the name in the subgenus Turbo (Marmarostoma)

Description

Distribution

References

 Alf A. & Kreipl K. (2003). A Conchological Iconography: The Family Turbinidae, Subfamily Turbininae, Genus Turbo. Conchbooks, Hackenheim Germany.
 Williams, S.T. (2007). Origins and diversification of Indo-West Pacific marine fauna: evolutionary history and biogeography of turban shells (Gastropoda, Turbinidae). Biological Journal of the Linnean Society, 2007, 92, 573–592
 Alf A. & Kreipl K. (2011) The family Turbinidae. Subfamily Turbinidae, Genus Turbo. Errata, corrections and new information on the genera Lunella, Modelia and Turbo (vol. I). In: G.T. Poppe & K. Groh (eds), A Conchological Iconography. Hackenheim: Conchbooks. pp. 69–72, pls 96–103.

External links

cepoides
Gastropods described in 1880